Droese is a surname. Notable people with the surname include:

 Duke Droese (born 1968), American retired professional wrestler and special education teacher
 Michael Droese (born 1952), German sprinter 
 Siegbert Droese (born 1969), German politician